Are You Putting Me On? was a Canadian reality television series which aired on CBC Television from 1975 to 1977.

Premise
This series featured highlights from earlier episodes of the series All About Toronto and Such Is Life, dwelling on features filmed with a hidden camera.

Scheduling
The half-hour series aired Saturdays at 7:00 p.m. (Eastern) from 14 June to 26 July 1975. It was rebroadcast Thursday evenings from 31 March to 19 May 1977.

References

External links
 

CBC Television original programming
1975 Canadian television series debuts
1977 Canadian television series endings